Fairpoint is an unincorporated community in Meade County, in the U.S. state of South Dakota.

History
A post office called Fairpoint was established in 1909, and remained in operation until 1966. The name Fairpoint was selected because it was supposed to be an uncommon name.

References

Unincorporated communities in Meade County, South Dakota
Unincorporated communities in South Dakota